Cuba competed at the 2004 Summer Paralympics in Athens, Greece. The team included 24 athletes, 19 men and 5 women. Competitors from Cuba won 11 medals, including 2 gold, 2 silver and 7 bronze to finish 43rd in the medal table.

Medallists

Sports

Athletics

Men's track

Men's field

Women's track

Women's field

Judo

Sergio Arturo Perez won a gold medal in the men's 60kg category however he was tested positive for a banned substance in which he was stripped of his gold medal.

Powerlifting

Men

Table tennis

Men

Women

See also
Cuba at the Paralympics
Cuba at the 2004 Summer Olympics

References 

Nations at the 2004 Summer Paralympics
2004
Summer Paralympics
Disability in Cuba